The Gift is a 2000 American supernatural horror thriller film directed by Sam Raimi, written by Billy Bob Thornton and Tom Epperson, and based on the alleged psychic experiences of Thornton's mother.

It centers on Annie (Cate Blanchett), who is involved in a murder case when she acquires knowledge of it through her extrasensory perception and psychic abilities. The cast also includes Keanu Reeves, Giovanni Ribisi, Hilary Swank, Katie Holmes, and Greg Kinnear.

Plot
In the town of Brixton, Georgia, widow Annie Wilson is a clairvoyant fortune-teller who has visions of her late grandmother. After Jessica King, the promiscuous fiancée of the local school's principal, Wayne Collins, disappears, Annie receives a vision revealing that Jessica has been killed and her body thrown into a pond.

She informs local sheriff Pearl Johnson of her vision, and despite his skepticism, Johnson searches a pond at the home of Donnie Barksdale, the abusive husband of one of Annie's clients, Valerie. Donnie has repeatedly threatened Annie and her three children after Annie advised Valerie to leave him, accusing Annie of being a witch and telling her and her children that she will burn in hell. Valerie permits the search while Donnie is absent, but he returns while the search is proceeding. The police find Jessica's body in the pond and Donnie is arrested for her murder.

Buddy Cole, a mentally ill acquaintance of Annie's, harbors a hatred for his father, and tries to explain to Annie why, but Annie is preoccupied and refuses to listen. That evening, Buddy's mother calls Annie to come to their house, as Buddy has snapped and has his father bound to a chair. Buddy sets his father on fire, and it is revealed that Buddy's father sexually abused him as a child. Buddy is arrested and taken to a mental hospital.

During Donnie's trial for Jessica's murder, it is revealed that they had an affair. Donnie is convicted and sent to prison. Later, Annie receives more visions revealing that Donnie is innocent and that someone else wants to kill her. She asks prosecutor David Duncan to reopen the case. After Duncan declines, Annie counters that if he does not do so, she will reveal David and Jessica's affair, which she witnessed. Duncan attempts to bribe Annie in exchange for her silence, but Annie refuses.

Annie tells Wayne that Donnie is not responsible for Jessica's death and that Duncan will not reopen the investigation. At Wayne's suggestion, he and Annie drive out to the pond at night, where Annie learns from a vision that Wayne is actually the murderer. Wayne confesses to Annie that he was angry after he discovered that Jessica was cheating on him with Donnie. Wayne attempts to kill Annie by striking her in the head with a flashlight, but Buddy appears and knocks him out. Annie and Buddy lock the unconscious Wayne in the trunk of Annie's car.

Buddy tells Annie that he escaped from the mental hospital, and hands her a wash cloth to wipe her bloody head with. The two drive to the police station. Annie tells Buddy that he will have to return to the hospital, and he waits in the car while she enters the station. When she returns to the car with police, Buddy has disappeared. Annie explains to Johnson what happened at the pond, but he informs her that Buddy could not have aided her as he had died by suicide at the mental hospital earlier that day. Annie reaches in her pocket and pulls out the wash cloth Buddy gave her to wipe her head. Annie returns home and looks at photographs of her late husband Ben. The next morning, she and her sons are at his grave, mourning his premature death.

Cast

Production
The film was written by Billy Bob Thornton and Tom Epperson before the success of Sling Blade.

Reception

Critical response
On Rotten Tomatoes the film has an approval rating of 57% based on 122 reviews, with an average score of 5.90/10. The site's consensus states "the A-list cast can't prevent the movie from becoming a by-the-numbers whodunit with an ending that's all but unsatisfactory." On Metacritic it has a score of 62% based on reviews from 29 critics, indicating "generally favorable reviews". Audiences surveyed by CinemaScore gave the film a grade B on scale of A to F.

Roger Ebert gave the film 3 out of 4, and called it "Ingenious in its plotting, colorful in its characters, taut in its direction and fortunate in possessing Cate Blanchett."
Peter Travers of Rolling Stone wrote: "Raimi's flair for rich atmospherics — expertly abetted by cinematographer Jamie Anderson (Grosse Pointe Blank) and composer Christopher Young (Wonder Boys) — and a cast that goes full throttle hold you in thrall. "
Todd McCarthy of Variety wrote: "Raimi eschews trendy, over-emphatic effects in favor of a straightforward approach that makes for a solid tale well told."

Kenneth Turan of the Los Angeles Times gave it a mixed review and was critical that the "Characters lean too heavily toward the Southern grotesque, and the direction the plot is heading is more predictable than it should be." Despite praising the cast, Turan wrote: "Overly familiar material, even well done, cannot be made more intrinsically interesting than it is. Not even by Cate Blanchett and Keanu Reeves." A. O. Scott of The New York Times wrote: "The picture is saved from mediocrity by Mr. Raimi's smooth competence, and by the unusually high quality of the acting."
Curt Fields of The Washington Post called it "So chock-full of stereotypes as to be a filmic Southern Country Safari" and advised "Don't Bother Opening This 'Gift'"

Box office
The film grossed $12,008,642 at the U.S. box office against a production budget of $10 million.

Accolades

References

External links
 
 

2000 films
2000 horror films
2000s mystery thriller films
2000 thriller drama films
American horror thriller films
American mystery thriller films
American supernatural horror films
American supernatural thriller films
American ghost films
American thriller drama films
Supernatural drama films
Films about domestic violence
Films directed by Sam Raimi
Films produced by James Jacks
Films set in Georgia (U.S. state)
Films shot in Georgia (U.S. state)
Films shot in Savannah, Georgia
Incest in film
Lakeshore Entertainment films
Paramount Vantage films
Southern Gothic films
Films scored by Christopher Young
Films produced by Tom Rosenberg
Films produced by Gary Lucchesi
Films about precognition
2000 drama films
2000s English-language films
2000s American films